Stager is an unincorporated community in Iron County, in the U.S. state of Michigan.

History
The community was named for Anson Stager, an official of the Western Union Telegraph Company.  The site was once the location of a Chicago and North Western Railway railroad right-of-way and telegraph line that connected Stager with Wakefield, Michigan, but nothing of the line remains except the State Line Trail built on the former railroad's roadbed.

References

Unincorporated communities in Iron County, Michigan